Thieves and Villains are an American indie rock band from the Hudson Valley region of New York, formed in 2007, and signed to Victory Records.

History
Thieves and Villains name is derived from lyrics penned by guitarist/vocalist/pianist Christopher Pennings, and when asked about the meaning in an interview the band stated: "People often have to engage in sketchy behavior to get ahead, so we decided that instead of ever allowing ourselves to follow that path we'd name our band 'Thieves and Villains' so that we as people don't have to be." Having met via the local Hudson Valley, NY music scene in 2005, Sergio Otaegui and Christopher Pennings decided to form the band in early 2007 following the breakups of their previous groups. The band claims to be influenced by "any artist that pushes themselves to exceed their own creative expectations"  and are known for their driving indie/alternative/rock sound. After posting their initial demos online on April 1, 2007, the band quickly hit the road to embark on a two-month-long national tour followed by a three-week stint on the 2007 Van's Warped Tour. After more demoing and touring, the band announced their signing to the Chicago, IL based Victory Records in February 2008.

Following their signing to Victory Records in early 2008, the band moved into a lake house in upstate NY to write their full-length debut Movement and spent most of May 2008 recording it with producer Paul Leavitt in Baltimore, MD. Movement was released on July 8, 2008 and received positive write-ups in music publications such as Alternative Press, appearances on Fuse TV, music features in popular television shows: Gossip Girl, The Real World, Making The Band, The Bad Girls Club, etc., and the support of organizations like People for the Ethical Treatment of Animals.

The band decided to regroup in mid-2009 with new members, bassist Chris Competiello and drummer Joseph Penna.

Thieves and Villains' second album "South America" was released on August 3, 2010.

Members
Sergio Otaegui – lead vocals, guitar
Christopher Pennings – guitar, vocals, piano
Chris Competiello – bass
Joseph Penna – drums

Former members
Justin Speca - Bass
Rob Delepana - Bass
Johnny Bell - Drums
Jimmi Kane - Drums
John Damiano - Drums

Discography

Albums
South America (August 3, 2010)
Movement (July 8, 2008)

Singles
Let Go (2008)
I Have Spread Some Love (Back to Basics) (2008)
Autobiography (2010)
Virginia Woolf (2010)

Interviews
Thieves and Villains - 01.14.09
NewsOnMusic Blog Interview with Thieves and Villains
Musiqtone- The Hotseat with Thieves and Villains
Thieves and Villains!//Out There//Peta2
E-Minor Music Blog: Interview with Sergio from Thieves and Villains
Music Buzz - Thieves and Villains 12.4.09
Bad Guys Playing Music - 04.18.10

References

External links
 Thieves and Villains Official Website
 Victory Records

Indie rock musical groups from New York (state)
Musical groups established in 2007
Musical quartets
Victory Records artists